is a Japanese actress associated with Amuse, Inc. She attended Omiya Junior High School and Hinode High School.

Filmography

Drama
Kaze no Haruka (2005)
My Boss My Hero (2006)
Sexy Voice and Robo (2007)
Good Job (2007)
Rookies (2008)
Detective Yuri Rintaro (2020), Yumi Nagoshi
Reach Beyond the Blue Sky (2021), Shibusawa Naka

Movies
Load 88 (2004)
Koibumi (2004)
Little DJ (2007)
We Can't Change the World. But, We Wanna Build a School in Cambodia. (2011)
Kashin (2016)
Birds Without Names (2017)
Coming Home (2020)
Sabakan (2022)

References

External links
  
 Official site 
 

1987 births
Living people
Japanese television actresses
Japanese film actresses
Actresses from Osaka Prefecture
People from Daitō, Osaka
Asadora lead actors
21st-century Japanese actresses
Amuse Inc. talents
21st-century Japanese women singers
21st-century Japanese singers